Nine United States presidents and one president-elect have made presidential visits to the Caribbean since 1928. Franklin D. Roosevelt made the most trips to the Caribbean islands (14), either for vacation or while involved with Allied diplomatic interactions during World War II. Of the 13 sovereign countries in the region, four—Dominica, the Dominican Republic, Saint Kitts and Nevis, and Saint Vincent and the Grenadines—have not as of yet been visited by an American president.

Table of visits
Note: This table does not include presidential visits to places that are part of the United States.

See also
 Bahamas–United States relations
 Cuba–United States relations
 Haiti–United States relations
 Dominican Republic–United States relations
 Jamaica–United States relations
 Antigua and Barbuda–United States relations
 Saint Kitts and Nevis–United States relations
 Dominica–United States relations
 Saint Lucia–United States relations
 Saint Vincent and the Grenadines–United States relations
 Grenada–United States relations
 Barbados–United States relations
 Trinidad and Tobago–United States relations

References

Lists of United States presidential visits
Bahamas–United States relations
Cuba–United States relations
Haiti–United States relations
Dominican Republic–United States relations
Jamaica–United States relations
Antigua and Barbuda–United States relations
Saint Kitts and Nevis–United States relations
Dominica–United States relations
Saint Lucia–United States relations
Saint Vincent and the Grenadines–United States relations
Grenada–United States relations
Barbados–United States relations
Trinidad and Tobago–United States relations